19th Joseph Plateau Awards
March 7, 2006

Best Film: 
 The Child 
The 19th Annual Joseph Plateau Awards, given on 7 March 2006, honoured the best Belgian filmmaking of 2005.

This year, L'enfant (The Child) of the brothers Dardenne won the "Big 5" (the five biggest prizes): Best Film, Actor, Actress, Director and Screenplay.

Winners and nominees

Best Belgian Actor
 Jérémie Renier - The Child (L'enfant)
Benoît Poelvoorde - Entre ses mains
Koen De Bouw - The Intruder (De indringer) and Elongated Weekend (Verlengd weekend)

Best Belgian Actress
 Déborah François - The Child (L'enfant)
Marie du Bled - Ultranova
Karlijn Sileghem - Suspect

Best Belgian Cinematography
 The Wedding Party (Die Bluthochzeit) - Danny Elsen
Bunder paradise and Ultranova 
The Ordeal (Calvaire)

Best Belgian Composer
 George Van Dam - Friday or Another Day (Vendredi ou un autre jour)
Jan Leyers - Gilles (Buitenspel)
Casimir Liberski - Bunder paradise

Best Belgian Director
 Jean-Pierre and Luc Dardenne - The Child (L'enfant)
Bouli Lanners - Ultranova
Frien Troch - Someone Else's Happiness (Een ander zijn geluk)

Best Belgian Film
 The Child (L'enfant)
The Sleeping Child (L'enfant endormi)
Someone Else's Happiness (Een ander zijn geluk)

Best Belgian Screenplay
 The Child (L'enfant) - Jean-Pierre and Luc Dardenne
Someone Else's Happiness (Een ander zijn geluk) - Fien Troch
Duplicity (Trouble) - Harry Cleven

Best Belgian Short Film
 Forever
Love's Lost and Happiness
The One Thing to Do (Une seule chose à faire)
The Sunflyers

Box Office Award
 Buitenspel

2005 film awards
Belgian film awards